Rättvik  is a locality on the eastern shore of the lake Siljan and the seat of Rättvik Municipality, Dalarna County, Sweden, with 4,686 inhabitants in 2010. Its bandy club IFK Rättvik has reached the highest division Elitserien and has built an indoor arena. The local baseball team, Rättvik Butchers has won the Swedish cup once and the Swedish championship twice.

References 

Municipal seats of Dalarna County
Swedish municipal seats
Populated places in Dalarna County
Populated places in Rättvik Municipality
Populated lakeshore places in Sweden

fi:Rättvikin kunta